Wehib Pasha also known as Vehip Pasha, Mehmed Wehib Pasha, Mehmet Vehip Pasha (modern Turkish: Kaçı Vehip Paşa or Mehmet Vehip (Kaçı), 1877–1940), was a general in the Ottoman Army. He fought in the Balkan Wars and in several theatres of World War I. In his later years, he acted as a military advisor to the Ethiopian army in the Second Italo-Abyssinian War.

Biography

Vehib was born in 1877 in Yanya (present day: Ioannina), then part of the Ottoman Empire. Coming from a prominent family of the city his father, Mehmet Emin Efendi, had served as its mayor. He was an  Albanian. His elder brother Esad Pasha defended Gallipoli in 1915, and Kâzım Taşkent  was the founder of Yapı Kredi, the first nationwide private bank in Turkey. Vehib himself graduated from the Imperial School of Military Engineering (Mühendishane-i Berrî-i Hümâyûn) in 1899, then from the Ottoman Military College (Staff College, Mekteb-i Erkân-ı Harbiye-i Şâhâne) as a staff captain and joined the Fourth Army, which was then stationed in Yemen. In 1909, after the 31 March Incident, Vehib was called to Constantinople, where he began to work at the Ministry of War. Shortly afterwards Mahmud Shevket Pasha appointed Vehib as the Commander of the Cadet School (Military high school, Askerî İdadi). He reached the rank of Major.

Balkan wars

During the First Balkan War, Vehib defended the Fortress of Yanya with his brother Esad Pasha who was the commander of the Yanya Corps, until 20 February 1913. The Ottoman forces eventually surrendered to the Greeks under Crown Prince Constantine.

After his release as a prisoner of war, Vehib was made a Colonel in the 22nd Infantry Division.  He was sent to Hejaz in Arabia.

First World War
The Ottoman Empire entered World War I and Vehib participated in the Gallipoli Campaign, commanding the XV Army Corps, and later the Second Army. His successes led to his being made commander of the Third Army during the Caucasus Campaign. His army defended against attacks by the Russians but was defeated in the battle of Erzinjan. In 1918, Vehib's Third Army regained the offensive and took back Trabzon on 24 February, Hopa in March, as well as Batumi on 26 March. With the Armistice of Mudros, Vehib returned to Constantinople.

War of Independence
Vehib did not participate in the Turkish War of Independence. After his return to Constantinople at the end of World War I, he was prosecuted for misuse of his office and jailed in Bekirağa prison. He escaped to Italy.  His citizenship was revoked by the new government of Turkey. He spent some time in Italy, Germany, Romania, Greece and Egypt. His dislike of Mustafa Kemal was well known and he never hid his contempt for the new leader of Turkey who had once fought under his command at Gallipoli. He did not return to Istanbul until 1940.

Abyssinia
Vehib participated in the Second Italo-Abyssinian War where he was known as Wehib Pasha. He served as the Chief-of-Staff to Ras Nasibu, the Ethiopian Commander-in-Chief on the southern front. Vehib designed a strong defensive line for the Ethiopians which was known as the "Hindenburg Wall", in reference to the famous German defensive line of World War I, the Hindenburg Line. However, the Italians broke through these defenses during the Battle of the Ogaden in April 1936.  Afterwards, Vehib left Ethiopia and returned to Istanbul.

Death
He died in 1940 and was buried at Karacaahmet Cemetery in Istanbul.

See also
Witnesses and testimonies of the Armenian genocide

Sources

External links
Who is who  

1877 births
1940 deaths
Military personnel from Ioannina
People from the Ottoman Empire of Albanian descent
Ottoman Imperial School of Military Engineering alumni
Ottoman Military College alumni
Ottoman military personnel of the Balkan Wars
Ottoman prisoners of war
Balkan Wars prisoners of war held by Greece
Ottoman Army generals
Pashas
Turkish people of Albanian descent
Ottoman military personnel of World War I
Burials at Karacaahmet Cemetery
Albanians from the Ottoman Empire
Witnesses of the Armenian genocide